KSRY (103.1 FM) is a radio station broadcasting an alternative rock format as a simulcast of KYSR (Alt 98.7) in Los Angeles, California. KSRY serves the Antelope Valley from its tower in Tehachapi, California. The station is owned by iHeartMedia, Inc.

History
103.1 FM was started by George Chambers in 1981 and was the first radio station licensed to Tehachapi. In 1983, Robert Adelman joined Chambers and created the first country music FM radio station (KTPI-FM) to serve the Antelope Valley with a signal covering the entire area. Mark Pompey was the first program director and later Larry Marino (who later moved to KRLA) served as operations manager of this station and another in Mojave, KDOL 1340. Studios were located in Mojave until they were moved to Palmdale. Chambers and Adelman sold KTPI-FM and KDOL to HPW in 1986. In December 2007, KTPI's format moved to 97.7 while 103.1 became a simulcast of KYSR, Los Angeles "Star 98.7". On January 2, 2008, the KTPI call letters were moved to 97.7 in Mojave, and the KOSS call letters came to 103.1 FM. On January 10, 2008, the KOSS call sign was changed to KSRY.

The tower is shared with KKZQ (100.1 FM, "The Quake"), owned by High Desert Broadcasting.

Programming
KSRY carries all programming originating from KYSR; this includes KYSR personalities: The Woody Show in mornings; @MartyInYourEar and harms on middays and afternoons, respectively.

References

External links

SRY
Modern rock radio stations in the United States
Radio stations established in 1981
IHeartMedia radio stations